Manuel Borja Garcia (born 29 August 1949) is a Mexican former footballer who played as a midfielder. He competed in the men's tournament at the 1972 Summer Olympics.

References

External links
 

1949 births
Living people
Mexican footballers
Association football midfielders
Mexico international footballers
Olympic footballers of Mexico
Footballers at the 1972 Summer Olympics
Place of birth missing (living people)